Abdesslam Benabdellah (born on 12 January 1964 in Arzew), is an Algerian former football player who played as a goalkeeper.

Honours

National
 Won the Algerian Cup once with USM Bel-Abbès in 1991
 Won the Algerian Championship twice with MC Oran in 1992 and 1993
 Won the Algerian Cup once with MC Oran in 1996
 Won the Algerian League Cup once with MC Oran in 1996
 Won the Moroccan Cup once with Wydad AC Casablanca in 1998
 Runner-up of the Algerian League once with MC Oran in 2000

International
 Won the Arab Super Cup once with MC Oran in 1999

Individual
 Best Algerian goalkeeper twice in 1994 and 1995

References

External links
 Player statistics - dzfootball

1964 births
1998 African Cup of Nations players
2000 African Cup of Nations players
Algerian footballers
Algeria international footballers
Algerian expatriate footballers
Algerian expatriate sportspeople in Morocco
Expatriate footballers in Morocco
Living people
Footballers from Oran
MC Oran players
Wydad AC players
Association football goalkeepers
21st-century Algerian people